QG may refer to:

Science and technology
 Quantum gravity, a theory in physics that aims to unify general relativity and quantum mechanics
 Quasigeostrophic, an atmospheric dynamics theory; see Geostrophic wind
 Quadrature Generator; see quadrature amplitude modulation
 Nissan QG engine, an automotive engine series
 ATCvet code QG, Genito-urinary system and sex hormones, a section of the Anatomical Therapeutic Chemical Classification System for veterinary medicinal products
 quod google (q.g.), an internet variation on Latin reference quod vide to indicate further information available

Other uses
 Quetta Gladiators, a cricket team franchise in Pakistan Super League
 Queen's Gambit, a chess opening move
 Citilink, an IATA airline code